KBLK-LP (106.3 FM) is a radio station licensed to Shreveport, Louisiana, United States. The station is currently owned by Blacks United For Lasting Leadership.

References

External links
 

Low-power FM radio stations in Louisiana
Gospel radio stations in the United States
Christian radio stations in Louisiana